Auchmithie is a small fishing village in Angus, Scotland, three miles north east of the town of Arbroath. It sits atop a cliff of red sandstone conglomerate of Devonian date, approximately 120 feet above a shingle beach.   Among the pebbles on the beach, derived from those weathered out of the cliffs (themselves derived from pebbles deposited by a massive ancient river-delta), a significant percentage are jasper, predominantly dark red, with rarer examples green or yellow.

In the dilapidated harbour, which began construction in 1889 and was designed by James Barron, there are still some small fishing boats.

The Arbroath smokie (haddock hot smoked in a particular way) is said to have originated in Auchmithie. Local legend has it a store caught fire one night, destroying barrels of haddock preserved in salt. The following morning, the people found some of the barrels had caught fire, cooking the haddock inside. Inspection revealed the haddock to be quite tasty.

Sir Walter Scott stayed in the Waverley Hotel in Auchmithie and described Auchmithie in his novel The Antiquary (1816), under the name 'Musslecrag'.

Gallery

References

External links 

Joe Dorward's website with a panoramic view of Auchmithie's harbour
Old photos of Auchmithie and the harbour, pre 1923
Latest census information, 2001, with specific reference to Auchmithie

Villages in Angus, Scotland